Francis Lyman Wing (May 9, 1868 -October 29, 1941) was a businessman, government official, and politician in Tampa, Florida. He served two terms as mayor of Tampa, Florida, the first from June 1900 until 1902 and the second from June 4, 1908, until June 6, 1910. He also served as county treasurer and on the city council.

He married Anna Hale in Tampa in 1892. Wing owned citrus groves.

A Democrat, Wing was preceded by Democrat Frank C. Bowyer and succeeded by Donald B. Mckay, the first of a long series of mayors who were members of the white supremacist White Municipal Party.

Wing was born in New Bedford, Massachusetts. He built a home in Tampa Heights.

See also
List of mayors of Tampa, Florida

Further reading
 The Mayors of Tampa: A Brief Administrative History by James W. Covington and Debbie Lee Wavering Tampa, Fl, University of Tampa, 1987

References

1868 births
1941 deaths
Florida Democrats
20th-century American politicians
American white supremacists
Politicians from New Bedford, Massachusetts
Florida city council members
Mayors of Tampa, Florida

County treasurers in the United States
County officials in Florida